Snow Fairy (foaled 12 February 2007) is a retired Thoroughbred racehorse who was bred in Ireland and trained in England by Ed Dunlop. She made little impression on the racecourse as a two-year-old, winning only one race out of six. She started her three-year-old season well, winning a listed race. Snow Fairy then started The Oaks at 12/1. Ridden by Ryan Moore, she won by a neck. Again ridden by Moore, she won the Irish Oaks easily. When taking on older horses for the first time in the Yorkshire Oaks, she finished second to Midday. Following a run in the St Leger, she went to Japan and won the Queen Elizabeth II Commemorative Cup followed by the Hong Kong Cup. As a four-year-old in 2011, she won the Queen Elizabeth II Commemorative Cup for a second time, but also placed in a number of top races, including third in the Arc de Triomphe and second in the Irish Champion Stakes. She stayed in training for the 2012 season and won the G1 Prix Jean Romanet at Deauville in August (later disqualified), and then the Irish Champion Stakes at Leopardstown in September.

Snow Fairy was retired in July 2013 after aggravating a tendon injury. Her owner announced that the filly would be sent to Islanmore Stud in County Limerick for breeding.

Breeding record

2015 Belle de Neige (IRE): filly by Elusive Pimpernel (USA)
2017 Virgin Snow (GB): filly by Gleneagles
2018 John Leeper (IRE): colt by Frankel

References

External links
pedigree
racing stats at racingpost.com

2007 racehorse births
Racehorses bred in Ireland
Racehorses trained in the United Kingdom
Cartier Award winners
Irish Classic Race winners
Thoroughbred family 1-k
Epsom Oaks winners